Necrophagist was a German technical death metal band founded and fronted by guitarist and vocalist Muhammed Suiçmez. The band used baroque music-influenced compositions paired with extreme metal drumming.

The name originates from the Greek roots νεκρο- nekro- ("dead body") and -φαγος - ("eater of"). This figuratively translates to eater of the dead; literally the eater of dead bodies.

History

1999–2004: Onset of Putrefaction and Epitaph 
Necrophagist's debut album Onset of Putrefaction has been out of print for years. The percussion on the album was handled by a drum machine. Eventually, a new edition with drum samples recorded by Hannes Grossmann was created. All of the old guitar, bass guitar and vocal tracks were mixed along with the brand new drum samples. The re-release also features two songs from Necrophagist's 1995 self-titled demo tape. The whole album was also engineered by long-time Necrophagist engineer and producer Christoph Brandes at The Iguana Studios. It was mastered by Bob Katz at "Digital Domain", Orlando, Florida. The re-release was issued in 2004 by Willowtip in the United States/Canada and Relapse in the rest of the world. In August 2001, Necrophagist performed at the Brutal Assault open air festival in the Czech Republic. The band also returned to perform in the years 2003, 2005 and 2010.

2004–2008: Touring and continued lineup changes 
On 10 February 2006, it was announced that Christian Münzner had departed the band due to scheduling conflicts. Later on, he joined the death metal band Obscura. A replacement guitarist was found, Sami Raatikainen, who is from Helsinki, Finland. Sami also plays in the band Codeon.

In 2006, the band undertook an American tour called "Carving North America's Epitaph". Necrophagist was joined on this tour by Arsis, Alarum, Neuraxis, Ion Dissonance, Cattle Decapitation and Thine Eyes Bleed. They, along with Dying Fetus, supported Cannibal Corpse on their U.S. tour in the fall, which also included some Canadian venues.

In 2007, the band announced on its Myspace profile that after the 2007 California Metalfest, drummer Hannes Grossmann would leave the band. Hannes stated that he was unable to commit to the band's full-time touring schedule. Marco Minnemann (who has played with Paul Gilbert, Terry Bozzio, Chad Wackerman) was the official permanent replacement for Hannes.

Necrophagist was a headlining act for The Summer Slaughter Tour in 2007, which featured a wide variety of other extreme metal bands including Decapitated, Arsis, The Faceless, Cephalic Carnage, As Blood Runs Black and Cattle Decapitation.

In April 2008, Necrophagist announced that Romain Goulon would be joining the band as their new drummer, replacing Minnemann, who would still be working with Suiçmez on a side project.

Necrophagist played in the "Pillage the Village Tour" in 2008 from 26 August 2008 to 10 September 2008 with death metal bands Dying Fetus and Beneath the Massacre. Shows in some areas also included Carcass, Suffocation, 1349 and Aborted.

2008–present: Hiatus 
In 2008, Necrophagist began work on its next album with new drummer Romain Goulon. According to rumors, two possible names were "The Path to Naught" and "Death to the Faithful". Suiçmez stated that the band would be using seven-string guitars on the album. Muhammed himself will be recording with a new custom shop Ibanez Xiphos guitar with seven strings, as well as 27 frets. Sami Raatikainen is an Ibanez guitar endorser, using a 7 String RG-Series guitar on stage.

As of 2012, it is unknown if Necrophagist are still active, or have plans to release a follow-up to Epitaph. This has led to a large amount of speculation on the part of fans, bewildered by the album's long wait. However, in a statement made in August 2012, former drummer Marco Minnemann stated there is indeed progress on a new album, saying "I know people are waiting for the new Necro album so bad. Muhammed is a very close friend of mine and I know he's really concerned about delivering the best album possible. But I personally know there's progress....hang on in there, I'm sure he'll deliver the goods."

On 11 September 2013, drummer Romain Goulon issued a statement that Necrophagist are still active and attempting to record a new album, however, there was no indication of when it would be released. Then on 4 April 2016, Goulon replied to a Facebook comment and stated "We're looking for a coffin to mourn the dead", saying that Necrophagist would not be moving forward as a band and are done.

Members 

Final lineup
 Muhammed Suiçmez – guitar, vocals (1992–2010)
 Stephan Fimmers – bass (2003–2010)
 Sami Raatikainen – guitar (2006–2010)
 Romain Goulon – drums (2008–2010)

Former members
Jochen Bittmann – bass (1992–2001)
Jan-Paul Herm – guitar (1992–1995)
Matthias Holzapfel – guitar (1995–2000)
Raphael Kempermann – drums (1992–1995)
Daniel Silva – drums (1995–1998, 2001–2003)
Shahram Naderi – drums (1998–2001)
Mario Petrovic – guitar (2000–2001)
Slavek Foltyn – drums (2000–2001)
Björn Vollmer – guitar (2001–2002)
Julien Laroche – bass (2001–2003)
Christian Münzner – guitar (2002–2006)
Heiko Linzert – bass (2003)
Hannes Grossmann – drums (2003–2007)
Marco Minnemann – drums (2007–2008)

Timeline

Discography 
Studio albums
Onset of Putrefaction (1999)
Epitaph (2004)

Demo tapes
Requiems of Festered Gore (1992)
Necrophagist (1995)

References

External links 
 
 

German technical death metal musical groups
Relapse Records artists
Musical groups established in 1992
Musical quartets
Musical groups disestablished in 2016